Bom Jesus da Lapa Airport  is the airport serving Bom Jesus da Lapa, Brazil.

History
The airport was commissioned on June 23, 1955.

Airlines and destinations
No scheduled flights operate at this airport.

Access

See also

List of airports in Brazil

References

External links

Airports in Bahia
Airports established in 1955
1955 establishments in Brazil